Pagodatrochus is a genus of mostly small deep water sea snails, marine gastropod mollusks in the subfamily Cantharidinae of the family Trochidae.

Species
Species within the genus Pagodatrochus include:
 †Pagodatrochus antistitensis Lozouet, 1998
 † Pagodatrochus sandbergeri (Füchs, 1869) 
 Pagodatrochus variabilis (H. Adams, 1873)

References

External links
 To World Register of Marine Species

 
Trochidae
Gastropod genera